Hostess is the name of a potato chip brand that was the leading brand in Canada for many years after its creation in 1935.  It merged with US-based Lay's in 1988.

History

Beginnings
Hostess was formed in 1935 when Edward Snyder began cooking chips on his mother's kitchen stove in Breslau, Ontario, outside Kitchener, Ontario. Potato chips remained a fairly small part of the snack food market until the 1950s, when snack foods in general became more widely available. In 1955, Snyder sold his company to E.W. Vanstone, who expanded the company greatly before selling his interest to General Foods in 1959.

Starting in 1981, the chips had new mascots known as the Munchies, that were used for advertisements and appeared on the chip packaging.  The Munchies were three friendly, goblin-like creatures coloured red, orange, and yellow.

New chapter

The introduction of corn chips to the market led to a partnership between Hostess and Frito-Lay (owned by PepsiCo) in 1987, bringing Doritos to Canada for the first time (Doritos were in Canada in the late 1970s). This move was followed by the introduction of other Frito Lay brands, including Ruffles, Tostitos and Cheetos (Lay's, Frito Lay's major US chip brand, was already being licensed for Canadian manufacture by another company). Hostess remained the major chip brand in Canada even after the arrangement. The partnership led to a merger in 1988, with the joint company known as Hostess Frito Lay. In 1992 PepsiCo acquired full ownership of Hostess by buying out General Foods' remaining interest.

Decline
With the brand popularity falling, in 1996 it was decided to re-brand the product as Lay's. This change presented no small amount of difficulty, as the product was already on sale in Canada via a third party. An aggressive advertising campaign by BBDO Canada featuring famous hockey players such as Mark Messier and Eric Lindros launched the "new" brand in 1997, and within eighteen months Lay's was selling twice the volume of products that it had been under the Hostess moniker. Hostess has largely disappeared, and the company dropped "Hostess" from its name, becoming Frito Lay Canada. 

The only remaining major Hostess retail product is Hickory Sticks, a flavoured potato stick brand which maintains broad distribution on par with other Lay's Canada brands.

In 2021, Frito-Lay re-introduced the salt and vinegar variety of Hickory Sticks in an unusually shaped bag for chips, being wider than it is tall.

Marketing
During its existence, the slogan for Hostess chips was "'Cause when you've got the munchies, nothing else will do. Hostess Potato Chips!"

References

Brand name snack foods
Brand name potato chips and crisps
Frito-Lay brands
PepsiCo subsidiaries
Products introduced in 1935
Defunct brands
Defunct food and drink companies of Canada
Canadian companies disestablished in 1996